Japan national amateur boxing athletes represents Japan in regional, continental and world tournaments and matches sanctioned by the Amateur International Boxing Association (AIBA).

Olympics

2004 Athens Olympics

One amateur boxer represented Japan to the 2004 Olympics. He was defeated in his first match by Endalkachew Kebede of Ethiopia.

Entry list
 Toshiyuki Igarashi (Light Flyweight)

Asian Games

2006 Doha Asian Games

This country was represented by three amateur boxers. Winning one bronze medal, Japan is ranked 11th in a four-way tie with DPR Korea, Syria and the host country Qatar.

Entry list
 Yoshiyuki Hirano (Welterweight)
 Ryota Murata (Middleweight)
 Katsuaki Susa (Flyweight) - Bronze

References

Amateur boxing
National amateur boxing athletes
B